Burkholderia singaporensis is a bacterium from the genus Burkholderia and the family Burkholderiaceae.

References

Burkholderiaceae